Northeast Dubois County School Corporation is a school district in the northeast corner of  Dubois County in southwestern Indiana. The school corporation serves the communities of Celestine, Crystal, Cuzco, Dubois, Haysville, and Hillham. It consists of one high school, Northeast Dubois High School, one middle school, Dubois Middle School and two elementary schools with a total enrollment of 1,012 students. Its certified staff count is 58. The current superintendent is Bill Hochgesang.

The Corporation's Vision is "Northeast Dubois - A Community Inspiring Tomorrow's Minds Today."

External links
Northeast Dubois County School Corporation website

 

School districts in Indiana
Southwestern Indiana
Education in Dubois County, Indiana